Dina  Chhan is a Cambodian painter and sculptor.

Life
Dina Chhan was born in Phnom Penh and spent her early years in a refugee camp in Poipet, a town near the border with Thailand. She is one of the few female artists on Cambodia's contemporary arts scene. She participated in the Cambodian Living Arts Fellows Programme in 2016. She received the CLMTV Contemporary Art Awards at Mahasarakham University in Thailand.

Themes
Chhan's themes include exploring women's roles and experiences. She also explores themes of nature and wildlife. Her exhibition entitled "On the Verge of Extinction" focused on endangered bird species in Cambodia. "Drawing the Golden Thread" was shown at the Intercontinental hotel and focused on the beauty of Cambodia's nature. Generally, she remarks that ideas for her works spawn when she takes excursions in her local rainforests, noting the haphazardly vibrant gestalt that unfolds as one walks further into the abyss of Cambodian verdure. Translating this into art, each piece features fauna of the rainforest revealing themselves amidst their hypersimulating environment.

References 

1984 births
Living people
21st-century women artists
Cambodian artists
People from Phnom Penh